The Edison Township Public Schools is a comprehensive community public school district, serving students in pre-kindergarten through twelfth grade from Edison, in Middlesex County, New Jersey, United States. The school district has two preschools, 11 elementary schools, four middle schools and two high schools that are part of the district, serving a culturally diverse student population.

As of the 2017–2018 school year, the district and its 19 schools had an enrollment of 16,203 students and 1,029.8 classroom teachers (on an FTE basis), for a student–teacher ratio of 15.7:1.

The district is classified by the New Jersey Department of Education as being in District Factor Group "GH", the third-highest of eight groupings. District Factor Groups organize districts statewide to allow comparison by common socioeconomic characteristics of the local districts. From lowest socioeconomic status to highest, the categories are A, B, CD, DE, FG, GH, I and J.

Schools 
The two public high schools separate the north and south ends of Edison. In the Edison High School zone to the south, there are six K - 5 elementary schools, while in the J.P. Stevens High School zone there are five K-5 elementary schools. Schools in the district (with 2017-18 enrollment data from the National Center for Education Statistics) are the following:
Preschools
Edison Early Learning Center (80 students; grades PreK-K)
Franklin D. Roosevelt Preschool (140; PreK-K)
Elementary schools
Benjamin Franklin Elementary School (610; K-5) 
Martin Luther King Jr. Elementary School (697; K-5)
Lincoln Elementary School (835; K-5)
Lindeneau Elementary School (478; K-5)
James Madison Primary School (584; K-2, who then move on to James Madison Intermediate)
James Madison Intermediate School (663; 3–5) 
John Marshall Elementary School (846; K-5)
Menlo Park Elementary School (857; K-5)
James Monroe Elementary School (542; K-5)
Washington Elementary School (602; K-5) 
Woodbrook Elementary School (964; K-5)
Middle schools (6-8)
John Adams Middle School (952; 6–8, from James Madison Intermediate and MLK Jr.) 
Herbert Hoover Middle School (826; 6–8, from Franklin, Lincoln, Monroe, and a few from Lindeneau)
Thomas Jefferson Middle School (744; 6–8, from Lindeneau, Marshall and Washington)
Woodrow Wilson Middle School (1,196; from Menlo Park and Woodbrook)
High schools (9-12)
Edison High School (1,971; 9–12, from Hoover and Jefferson)
J.P. Stevens High School (2,486; 9–12, from Adams and Wilson)

J.P. Stevens was the 30th-ranked public high school in New Jersey out of 339 schools statewide, in New Jersey Monthly magazine's September 2014 cover story on the state's "Top Public High Schools", after being ranked 80th in 2012 out of 328 schools. Edison High School was ranked 135th in 2014 and 174th in 2012.

James Monroe Elementary School was destroyed in a six-alarm fire on March 22, 2014. With nearly $24 million in insurance proceeds, the school was rebuilt and reopened to students in January 2017.

The school district has a technology program, which involves kindergarteners and first graders with iPads, students in second through eighth with Chromebooks, and ninth through 12th with MacBooks.

Connect-ED
For the 2007–08 school year, students were asked to provide home telephone numbers for the new ConnectED system. This automated notification system allows automated telephone calls to be placed to parents and staff in the event of an emergency. The system is also connected to the district-wide attendance system. Should a student be absent from school, a call is automatically placed to the telephone number provided.

Awards and recognition 
In 2009–10, Martin Luther King Jr. Elementary School] received the National Blue Ribbon Award of Excellence from the United States Department of Education, the highest honor that an American school can achieve.

Board of Education 
The Edison school district is run by a nine-member elected board of education, which operates independently of the township's municipal government. The Board provides oversight of the district's senior administrators, who in turn directly manage the schools.

The current members of Edison Board of Education are Shannon Peng, Joseph Romano, Biral Patel, Brian Rivera, Mohin Patel, Virginia White, Douglas Schneider, Jerry Shi and Vishal Patel

Administration
Core members of the district's administration are:
Dr. Bernard Bragen, Superintendent

Overcrowding 
In recent years, overcrowding in public schools has become a noticeable issue. Additions to school buildings have already been built at Woodbrook and Menlo Park Elementary Schools, and portable classrooms have been installed at Franklin D. Roosevelt Preschool and Woodrow Wilson Middle School. Voters rejected a $189.5 million proposal to expand six schools in December 2019, as well as a modified $183.2 million proposal in March 2020.

References

External links 
Edison Township Public Schools

School Data for the Edison Township Public Schools, National Center for Education Statistics

Edison, New Jersey
New Jersey District Factor Group GH
School districts in Middlesex County, New Jersey